The siege of Malta of 1429 was an attempt by Hafsid Tunisia to take over the island of Malta, then part of the Kingdom of Sicily. The invaders were repelled but many Maltese were killed or enslaved.

Background
By the 15th century, the Maltese islands had been completely christianized, and had just been freed from feudalism in 1426. At the time, Malta had a population of about 16,000 to 18,000 people.

Malta's defence consisted of an Aragonese army, as well as 300 Maltese Dejma soldiers. More soldiers were rallied and about 4,000 men took up arms against the Hafsid invaders.

Siege
In September 1429, an army of about 18,000 Hafsid men led by Kaid Ridavan arrived in Malta from Tunisia. The Hafsids first attacked the capital city of Mdina. After three days of fierce fighting, they left the city, looting the other towns on the way. At one point, the Augustinian monastery in Rabat was captured and destroyed by the invaders.

Throughout the siege, 3,000 Maltese inhabitants were captured by the Hafsids and were taken as prisoners, while many others were killed. The rulers of Sicily subsequently encouraged immigration to Malta to replace the diminished population. The siege devastated Malta, and its effects were felt for a number of years afterwards.

According to local legends, Saint George, Saint Paul and Saint Agatha helped the Maltese during the siege. St Paul appeared on a white horse with a dagger in his hand to defend the Maltese. In 1682, Mattia Preti was commissioned to paint a painting of this event. The painting can now be found in a chapel within St Paul's Cathedral in Mdina.

Legacy
Despite being less well known than the 1565 siege, according to some historians, the 1429 siege was worse because the Maltese fought the invaders alone, without any foreign help.

See also
 Invasion of Gozo (1551)
 Great Siege of Malta (1565)

References

Conflicts in 1429
Battles involving the Kingdom of Sicily
Sieges involving Malta
Siege of Malta
1429 in Europe
Mdina
15th century in the Kingdom of Sicily
Invasions of Malta